These are the international rankings of Kuwait

International rankings

References

Kuwait